Riwha Tītokowaru (c. 1823–1888) was a Māori leader in the Taranaki region of New Zealand.

Early life 
Riwha was a subtribal leader (having succeeded his father "Tītokowaru") of the Ngāti Ruanui and Ngāruahine iwi in South Taranaki. A lot of what was accomplished by his father had been wrongly attributed to the son; being events of intertribal warring during his time of preadolescence. There is some mystery about his early life, but he is known to have become a Methodist in 1842 having been baptised and given the name of Hohepa Otene (named after the missionary). He joined the "King Movement" and fought in the First Taranaki War in 1860 and 1861.

In 1865 and 1866, British troops conducted a punitive campaign throughout Taranaki, though they were unable to force a decisive result. 

In 1867, the year was declared by Tītokowaru to be a year of peace,  "the year of the daughters...the year of the lamb", and he led over 100 of his followers on a peace march during the winter of 1867 from Waihi, near Hawera, down to Patea and Whanganui and ending at Pipiriki on the upper Whanganui River.

However, continuing disputes with settlers proved intolerable and in 1868 Tītokowaru went to war.

Tītokowaru's War (1868-69) 

In June 1868 Tītokowaru's forces destroyed a colonist blockhouse at Turuturumokai, inland of Hawera. The colonial response was to send a large contingent to destroy Tītokowaru's stronghold. On 7 September 1868 the colonial forces were defeated with heavy casualties. The stronghold was then abandoned. Amongst the dead was the famous Prussian adventurer Gustavus von Tempsky. Turuturumokai was, previous to becoming a Pākehā garrison, a small Māori encampment, which had been found to be abandoned. Later after careful surveying, it was also discovered that, contrary to appearances, Turuturumokai was not as inconquerable as thought by British troops. The Māori decision to leave Turuturumokai was a strategic move.

Tītokowaru then advanced southward and defeated a second colonial force at Moturoa. He then stopped at Tauranga Ika and proceeded to build another fortress pa. This diamond-shaped fortress is considered the strongest ever constructed in New Zealand according to James Belich. It had numerous underground bunkers and tunnels, which could withstand heavy bombardment. There were three types of firing positions: trenches, loopholed palisades and European-style bastions from which fire could be directed along the frontages of the diamond. On the north-west corner was a tall lookout tower. At 5 am, on 2 February 1869, the advance party moved to within a few hundred meters of the stronghold and artillery opened fire. Maori returned rifle fire from within. Under cover of darkness, the colonial force closed the fort to within shouting distance. Both sides shouted and sang to encourage themselves until at 3 am the fighting reached a peak, gradually dying away until daybreak. At dawn, the army noticed the pa had gone very quiet. Three men approached the pa with great caution and found it deserted.

Later life 

His later understanding of the needed union of two peoples (Māori and settler) was incomparable. He advocated peace and diplomacy between the British and Māoridom. He practised his own message, demonstrating great tolerance that was noted by many settlers and authority figures of his time.

In 1886, he was part of a peaceful occupation of land near Manaia. Tītokowaru and nine others were taken to Wellington and, after being held in jail for two and a half months, were tried and sentenced to jail.  He died shortly afterwards.

Hailed as a war leader, prophet and peacemaker, Tītokowaru's story lapsed into obscurity before being popularised by New Zealand historian James Belich in his works on the New Zealand Wars.  He is also the subject of a Maurice Shadbolt novel Monday's Warriors.  The character, Te Kaipo, in the 2005 film River Queen, played by Temuera Morrison, is closely based on Tītokowaru.

See also
Tītokowaru's War
New Zealand Wars
Marian Maguire, artist whose series Titokowaru's Dilemma depicts a dialogue between Tītokowaru and Socrates

References

The Fox Boy. Peter Walker. Bloomsbury. 2001 

I Shall not Die. James Belich. Wellington 1989.

Military leaders of the New Zealand Wars
1823 births
1888 deaths
New Zealand Māori religious leaders
People from Taranaki
Māori prophets
Ngāti Ruanui people
Ngāruahine people